The Chariots of Fire is the single richest four-year-old harness race for Standardbreds in Australia. It is raced in February at Menangle raceway.

Race results 

Past winners and place-getters are as follows:

See also

 A G Hunter Cup
 Australian Pacing Championship
 Inter Dominion Pacing Championship
 Miracle Mile Pace
 New Zealand Trotting Cup
 Queensland Pacing Championship
 Victoria Cup
 Harness racing in Australia

Reference list

Harness races in Australia